The HA postcode area, also known as the Harrow postcode area, is a group of ten postcode districts in England, within seven post towns. These cover part of northwest London, plus a very small part of south Hertfordshire.

The main sorting office is in Greenford (Green Park Way) and the area served includes virtually all of the London Borough of Harrow, the northeastern part of the London Borough of Hillingdon, the western part of the London Borough of Brent and small parts of the London Boroughs of Barnet and Ealing, while the northern part of HA6 covers a small part of the Three Rivers district of Hertfordshire.



Coverage
The approximate coverage of the postcode districts:

! HA0
| WEMBLEY
| Wembley Central (west), North Wembley, Alperton, Sudbury (south)
| Brent, Ealing, Harrow
|-
! HA1
| HARROW
| Harrow, Harrow on the Hill, North Harrow, Northwick Park, Sudbury (north), Sudbury Hill
| Brent, Harrow
|-
! HA2
| HARROW
| North Harrow, South Harrow, West Harrow, Headstone, Rayners Lane (south)
| Harrow
|-
! HA3
| HARROW
| Harrow Weald, Kenton, Wealdstone, Queensbury, Belmont (west and south)
| Brent, Harrow
|-
! HA4
| RUISLIP
| Ruislip, Eastcote (west and south), South Ruislip, Ruislip Manor, Ruislip Gardens   
| Hillingdon
|-
! HA5
| PINNER
| Pinner, Eastcote (north and east), Hatch End, Rayners Lane (north), Carpenders Park (part)
| Harrow, Hillingdon, Three Rivers
|-
! HA6
| NORTHWOOD
| Northwood, Northwood Hills, Moor Park
| Hillingdon, Three Rivers
|-
! HA7
| STANMORE
| Stanmore, Queensbury, Belmont (north and east)
| Brent, Harrow
|-
! HA8
| EDGWARE
| Edgware, Burnt Oak, Canons Park, Queensbury
| Barnet, Brent, Harrow
|-
! HA9
| WEMBLEY
| Wembley Central (east), Wembley Park, Preston, Tokyngton
| Brent
|}

Map

See also
Gore Hundred, which formed an area of about the same size, centred slightly east
Postcode Address File
List of postcode areas in the United Kingdom

References

External links
Royal Mail's Postcode Address File
A quick introduction to Royal Mail's Postcode Address File (PAF)

Postcode areas covering London
Postcode areas covering the East of England
Media and communications in the London Borough of Harrow
Media and communications in the London Borough of Hillingdon
Media and communications in the London Borough of Brent
Media and communications in the London Borough of Barnet